Bobbie Diane Eakes (born July 25, 1961) is an American actress and singer. She is known for her role as Macy Alexander on The Bold and the Beautiful (1989–2000, 2001, 2002–2003) and for her role as Krystal Carey on All My Children (2003–2011).

Biography

Personal life
She is the youngest of five daughters in an Air Force family.

Eakes was Miss Georgia 1982, placing among the top 10 at Miss America 1983. She studied at the University of Georgia. In 1992 she married novelist and actor David Steen on July 4.

Career
Eakes received bit roles on nighttime television series, such as Cheers, before becoming successful in the soap opera genre. In the mid-1980s, she was the lead singer of the dance-pop rock group Big Trouble. The group released one self-titled CD in 1987, which was produced by Giorgio Moroder. Their single "Crazy World" charted on the U.S. singles chart, reaching No. 71. As a result, Big Trouble became short-lived one-hit wonders.

She first achieved fame in the role of Macy Alexander on the soap opera The Bold and the Beautiful, which she played from 1989 to 2000 (on contract), 2001 (guest appearance) and 2002 to 2003 (on contract). A very popular "good girl" kind of character, Macy battled with her inner demons (including an addiction to alcohol) before finally finding happiness with Deacon Sharpe (played by Sean Kanan). On the show, Macy was an accomplished singer in her own right (in tune with Eakes' hobby).

Between stints as Macy, Eakes hosted shows on the country music television channel Great American Country. She was also featured on country music singer Collin Raye's 2000 single "Tired of Loving This Way", which peaked at No. 50 on the Billboard Hot Country Singles & Tracks (now Hot Country Songs) charts.

On July 7, 2000, her character "died" in a fiery explosion when her car crashed into a gasoline truck when the writers of the show felt the character of Macy no longer contributed to the show's storyline. She was brought back to the show during the B&B location shoot at Portofino, Italy in December 2002, and was then killed off after a chandelier fell on her during a concert in 2003. The decision was made to kill Macy off a second time after Eakes had decided to take the role of Krystal Carey on All My Children, as the complete opposite of Macy, playing the sexy and sassy character. The role of Krystal is loosely based on Eakes' Southern upbringing.

Eakes also starred in productions of Cinderella and Love Letters opposite her former costar Jeff Trachta in Los Angeles. The two have still been friends offscreen. The CD they recorded together, Bold and Beautiful Duets, went double-platinum in Europe.

With All My Children airing its final episode on ABC in September 2011, earlier in June it was highly rumored that Eakes would be returning to The Bold and the Beautiful. She also starred as Katherine "Kitty" on The Grove: The Series created by Crystal Chappell and in 12 episodes of Tainted Dreams. Both were released exclusively online.

Filmography

Discography

Albums

Guest singles

Music videos

Awards and nominations

References

External links
 
 Bobbie Eakes Divas of Daytime Interview
 Official Bobbie Eakes Channel
 Official Bobbie Eakes Message Board
 Bobbie Eakes profile

1961 births
Living people
American women country singers
American soap opera actresses
American television actresses
Miss America 1980s delegates
People from Warner Robins, Georgia
Actresses from Georgia (U.S. state)
University of Georgia alumni
American women pop singers
Country musicians from Georgia (U.S. state)
American film actresses
American pop rock singers
20th-century American actresses
20th-century American women singers
20th-century American singers
21st-century American women
Singers from Georgia (U.S. state)